William Perry Clements Jr. (April 13, 1917 – May 29, 2011) was an American businessman and Republican Party politician who served two non-consecutive terms as the governor of Texas between 1979 and 1991. His terms bookended the sole term served by Mark Wells White, a Democrat who defeated Clements in the 1982 election only to lose his campaign for re-election in 1986.

When Clements was first sworn in during 1979, he became the first Republican to have served as governor of Texas since Reconstruction. When Clements left office for good at the end of his second term in 1991, his eight years in office were the most served by any Texas governor until Rick Perry surpassed his total in 2009. Clements was the first governor to be elected to multiple terms since Texas changed its constitution in 1972 to extend their governor's term of office to four years; since then, Perry and his predecessor, George W. Bush and successor, Greg Abbott, also Republicans, have also won multiple terms.

Before he became Governor of Texas, Clements made his fortune in crude oil and served as United States Deputy Secretary of Defense for President Richard Nixon. After his first gubernatorial term ended, Clements joined the administrative staff at Southern Methodist University where he served as chairman of the Board of Governors; while there, he presided over a massive pay-to-play system in the school's football program that resulted in catastrophic consequences for the team and the end of his political career.

Early life and career 
Born in Dallas, Texas, Clements graduated from Highland Park High School in the Dallas suburb of University Park in 1934. Although Clements was an all-state offensive guard on the Highland Park football team, after his father lost his job due to the Great Depression, Clements worked as an oil driller in South Texas after graduating from high school. In the late 1930s, Clements studied engineering at Southern Methodist University before returning to the oil industry. During World War II, Clements served in the United States Army Corps of Engineers.

In 1947, Clements founded the offshore drilling business Southeastern Drilling Company (SEDCO), which would expand to 20 countries and grow into the top drilling contracting company in the world before being sold to Schlumberger in 1984. Clements had a personal wealth worth nearly $30 million by 1978, the year he first ran for Texas governor.

From 1973 to 1977, Clements served as United States Deputy Secretary of Defense under Presidents Richard Nixon and Gerald Ford. For 39 days in 1973, Clements served as acting Secretary of Defense.

Among the Secretaries of Defense he served under was Donald Rumsfeld, during the latter's first tenure in the office. The two men did not get along, yet when Rumsfeld was appointed Clements resisted efforts to be moved to another department, even going so far as to threaten if removed from his office to hold a press conference and label his dismissal a "power play." Though Clements remained as deputy secretary, Clements later termed his time under Rumsfeld "very unpleasant."

Gubernatorial elections 

On January 16, 1979, Clements succeeded Democrat Dolph Briscoe as governor of Texas. To win the position, he first defeated State Representative Ray Hutchison in the Republican primary by a lopsided vote of 115,345 to 38,268. Hutchison, a prominent Dallas attorney, is the second husband of Texas State Treasurer (1991–1993) and U.S. Senator Kay Bailey Hutchison, who served from 1993 to 2013. Clements enjoyed the support of former state party chairman Peter O'Donnell, organizer of the Draft Goldwater Committee in 1963–1964. O'Donnell became a key adviser to Clements, who won the general election held on November 8, 1978, by having narrowly defeated Democratic former Texas Supreme Court Chief Justice John Luke Hill, who had also served six years as state attorney general. Clements polled 1,183,828 votes (49.96 percent) to Hill's 1,166,919 votes (49.24 percent). The La Raza nominee, Mario C. Compean, and two other minor candidates split the remaining 18,942 votes. The more liberal Hill, who had also once been the appointed Secretary of State of Texas, had defeated Briscoe in the primary.

In winning, Clements achieved victory with 350,158 fewer votes than the 1972 GOP nominee, Henry Grover, who went down to defeat because turnout was much lower in the 1978 off-year election than it had been during the presidential election year. The 1972 Texas governor's race was the last to coincide with a presidential election because when the terms went to four years, the gubernatorial elections were also set to coincide with the off years between presidential elections.

In 1981, Clements jump-started the long judicial careers of three San Antonio Republican lawyers, David Peeples, Tom Rickhoff and David Berchelmann with their appointments to state district courts numbered 285, 289, and 290, respectively. Rickhoff subsequently served on the Court of Appeals for the Fourth District. In 1989, Clements in his second term appointed Berchelmann as the first Republican to serve on the Texas Court of Criminal Appeals; he was defeated in 1990 but staged a comeback in 1992 on the 37th Judicial District Court, on which he served until January 2013.

Clements ran for reelection in 1982 but was defeated by Democratic Attorney General Mark Wells White by more than 327,000 votes because of sagging economic indicators and weak support from minority voters, who historically support Democratic candidates.  Clements was also damaged politically by the Ixtoc I oil spill disaster; the rig that failed was owned by SEDCO, but leased to Permargo (a Mexican drilling firm), which had an exploration contract with Pemex, despite his shares in SEDCO being held in blind trust at the time; his opponent, White, as attorney general, led the state's lawsuit against SEDCO.  White received 1,697,870 votes (53.2 percent) to Clements's 1,465,537 (45.9 percent). In addition, the Republican down-ballot candidates were all defeated in 1982, including George Strake Jr., a Houston businessman who had been Clements's former secretary of state. Strake ran for lieutenant governor against the incumbent Democrat, Bill Hobby. After the 1982 campaign, Strake was named to replace Chet Upham of Mineral Wells as the Republican state chairman, a position that he filled from 1983 to 1988.

Ernest Angelo, a former mayor of Midland who was a Texas co-chair of Ronald Reagan's attempt in 1976 to wrest the Republican presidential nomination from Gerald R. Ford, said that Clements's defeat in 1982 was his own greatest disappointment in politics even though Angelo himself lost a bid for the District 25 seat in the Texas State Senate in that same election.

Staging the 1986 comeback 

In between his two terms as governor, Clements was chairman of the board of governors of Southern Methodist University in Dallas. He ran again in 1986 and won a contested GOP primary against U.S. Representative Thomas Loeffler of New Braunfels, the seat of Comal County, and former Democratic turned Republican Congressman Kent Hance of Lubbock. In the fall, Clements unseated Governor White, who was hurt by the unpopularity of the "no pass/no play" policy involving high school athletics and proposed teacher competency testing. In gaining his second term, Clements polled 1,813,779 ballots (52.7 percent) to White's 1,584,512 (46.1 percent). Clements had turned the tables on White in a near mathematical reversal of the 1982 results and was inaugurated for a second nonconsecutive term on January 20, 1987, just after White came "Striding up to Clements in the Capitol rotunda" and extended a hand for a handshake with congratulations and Clements simply shook it without comment and turned away.

Clements as governor 
His first term was marked by SEDCO's involvement in the largest oil blowout in history, the Ixtoc I oil spill, which caused extensive environmental damage. Clements faced heavily Democratic state legislatures during his tenure. In 1979, the legislature overrode one of his vetoes, the last time that Texas lawmakers have completed an override. In 1980, Clements commuted the death sentence of Randall Dale Adams to life in prison. Adams, the subject of The Thin Blue Line, an Errol Morris documentary film, was exonerated in 1989 after serving twelve years in prison.  Clements was also governor at the time of the execution of Carlos DeLuna, who was put to death in 1989; evidence questioning the findings of facts that underlay DeLuna's conviction was published in 2012.

During his second term, Clements worked to reduce crime, improve education, boost the Texas economy, and to foster better relations with Mexico, especially on issues important to the mutual borders, such as immigration and the War on Drugs.

However, he did not push as pledged for the initiative and referendum reforms advocated by State Senator Walter Mengden of Houston, based on the principle of California's Proposition 13.

Clements's second term was marred by a startling revelation he made two months after taking office. On March 3, 1987, Clements admitted that he and the other members of the SMU board of governors had approved a secret plan to continue payments to 13 football players from a slush fund provided by a booster. Clements said that the board agreed to "phase out" the slush fund at the end of the 1986 season, but that it felt duty-bound to honor prior commitments to the players. The decision to continue the payments ultimately led to the NCAA shutting down the football program for the 1987 season—the so-called "death penalty."  SMU then opted not to field a team in 1988 either, claiming it could not put together a competitive squad. The shutdown and other sanctions left the once-proud Mustang football program in ruin; SMU has had only two winning seasons since returning to the field, and would not procure another bowl bid until 2009, and it would also be another ten years before they would be ranked in the top 25 in the Amway Coaches Poll by the USA Today.  A few months later, the College of Bishops of the United Methodist Church released a report detailing an investigation of its own into the scandal. It revealed that Clements had met with athletic director Bob Hitch, and the two agreed that the payments had to continue because the football program had "a payroll to meet."

According to the report, in late 1985 then SMU President L. Donald Shields and board of trustees chairman Edwin L. Cox wanted to stop the payments completely, in opposition to Clements and Hitch. The four held a "most important meeting" in August 1985 in Shields's office in the SMU administration building, Perkins Hall.  Shields and Cox noted that although earlier in the year a phase-out of the payments had been agreed upon by SMU leadership, the NCAA had just enacted the "death penalty" for repeat violators (of which SMU was one, having been cited six times to that point by the organization and twice in the last five years) for violations occurring on or after September 1 of that year, and thus the situation had changed. But Clements, admitting his way would be "taking a chance", argued that if the payments were stopped immediately, star players receiving them would be sure to leave SMU and publicly announce why. Nothing was formally decided at the meeting, but afterwards, Clements and Hitch talked for about fifteen minutes in the Perkins Hall parking lot. Hitch remembered Clements asking him if the payments could be continued and when hearing that they could, telling him in no uncertain terms to "do it." And the payments continued (on at least two occasions starting in 1983, after President Shields expressed outrage over the payments and said they had to stop, Clements, an SMU dropout, told the PhD holder Shields to "stay out of it" and to "go run the university").

A week later, Clements apologized for his role in continuing the payments. He said that he had learned about the slush fund in 1984, and an investigation by the board of governors revealed that players had been paid to play since the mid-1970s. Clements said that rather than shut the payments down immediately, the board "reluctantly and uncomfortably" decided to continue paying players who had already been guaranteed payments. However, he said, in hindsight the board "should have stopped (the payments) immediately," rather than merely phase them out.

Clements faced calls for his impeachment as a result of these statements; two state legislators argued that he would have never been elected had he honestly addressed his role in the scandal. Under the circumstances, he opted not to run for a third term as governor and was succeeded on January 15, 1991, by Democratic State Treasurer Ann Richards.

Post-political life 

After leaving the governorship, Clements resided in Dallas with his second wife, the former Rita Crocker Bass (October 30, 1931 – January 6, 2018), who was first lady of Texas during both of his terms. She was subsequently appointed to the University of Texas Regents by Governor George W. Bush. Clements was known for his acerbic, energetic personality.

Clements lent considerable personal effort to support several other Republican candidates seeking office in Texas. In 1993, he supported the conservative U.S. Representative Joe Barton in the special election for the U.S. Senate to succeed newly resigned Democrat Lloyd Bentsen. Barton lost out to Kay Bailey Hutchison. Clements also supported the embattled Texas Supreme Court Justice Steven Wayne Smith, who was beaten through the opposition of Governor Rick Perry in the 2004 Republican primary.

Whereas Governor Perry first endorsed former Mayor Rudolph W. Giuliani of New York City for the 2008 Republican presidential nomination, Bill Clements was as early as 2006 already raising funds for the eventual nominee, Senator John McCain of Arizona. After Giuliani withdrew from the race, Perry joined Clements in endorsing McCain.

In June 2009, Clements donated $100 million to UT Southwestern Medical Center, the largest civic donation in Dallas history. On April 13, 2012, Daniel K. Podolsky, President of UT Southwestern Medical Center announced the UT System Board of Regents approved the naming of the new UT Southwestern University Hospital in honor of Clements. On February 16, 2010, Clements and his wife both endorsed Governor Rick Perry's re-election campaign in the 2010 Texas Republican gubernatorial primary against Kay Bailey Hutchison. Clements, incidentally, won the Republican nomination that ultimately led to his first term as governor by defeating Hutchison's husband, Ray, in the 1978 GOP primary.

In October 2010, Clements's son, B. Gill Clements (born 1941), was murdered at the age of 69 near his ranch in Athens in Henderson County in east Texas. An investor, Clements was also a graduate of Southern Methodist University, married, and the father of three children. He was predeceased by his mother, Pauline Allen Gill Clements, Bill Clements's first wife.

Death 
On May 29, 2011, Clements died at age 94 in a Dallas hospital from natural causes. He is buried at the Grove Hill Memorial Park in Dallas.

See also

Southern Methodist University football scandal
Clements Center for National Security

References

Further reading
 Bridges, Kenneth William. "The Twilight of the Texas Democrats: The 1978 Governor's Race," Ph.D. dissertation, University of North Texas, 2003, 281 pages; AAT 3117260 in ProQuest
 Cunningham, Sean P. Cowboy Conservatism: Texas and the Rise of the Modern Right (2010)

Videos

(1) Closing Plenary Session of the National Governors Association from July 31, 1990 

(2) C-SPAN Interview on July 30, 1990 

(3) International Trade and Economic Development from Republican Governors Association on November 13, 1989 

(4) Commencement Address by President George H.W. Bush at Texas A&M University on May 12, 1989 

(5) Committee on Justice & Public Safety from the National Governors Association on February 26, 1989 

(6) Bush-Quayle Campaign Rally at the Galleria Shopping Center in Houston, Texas on November 7, 1988 

(7) Campaign Rally by President Ronald Reagan at Mesquite Rodeo Arena in Mesquite, Texas on November 5, 1988 

(8) Tribute to US House Speaker Jim Wright from October 11, 1988 

(9) Quayle Campaign Rally from September 27, 1988 

(10) Justice & Public Safety Committee from the National Governors Association on August 8, 1988

External links
 Papers of Governor William P. Clements at Texas A&M University

'Bill Clements Dies at 94; Set Texas on G.O.P. Path', James C. McKinley Jr., The New York Times, May 30, 2011

1917 births
2011 deaths
Highland Park High School (University Park, Texas) alumni
Southern Methodist University alumni
American energy industry businesspeople
Businesspeople from Texas
Republican Party governors of Texas
Politicians from Dallas
United States Deputy Secretaries of Defense
United States Army Corps of Engineers personnel
20th-century American businesspeople
20th-century American Episcopalians
20th-century American philanthropists